The Lakota (pronounced) are a Native American people. Also known as the Teton Sioux (from Thítȟuŋwaŋ), they are one of the three prominent subcultures of the Sioux people. Their current lands are in North and South Dakota. They speak Lakȟótiyapi—the Lakota language, the westernmost of three closely related languages that belong to the Siouan language family.

The seven bands or "sub-tribes" of the Lakota are:

 Sičháŋǧu (Brulé, Burned Thighs)
 Oglála ("They Scatter Their Own")
 Itázipčho (Sans Arc, Without Bows)
 Húŋkpapȟa (Hunkpapa, "End Village", Camps at the End of the Camp Circle)
 Mnikȟówožu (Miniconjou, "Plant Near Water", Planters by the Water)
 Sihásapa ("Blackfeet” or “Blackfoot")
 Oóhenuŋpa (Two Kettles)

Notable Lakota persons include Tȟatȟáŋka Íyotake (Sitting Bull) from the Húnkpapȟa, Maȟpíya Ičáȟtagya (Touch the Clouds) from the Miniconjou, Heȟáka Sápa (Black Elk) from the Oglála, Maȟpíya Lúta (Red Cloud) from the Oglála, Tamakhóčhe Theȟíla (Billy Mills) from the Oglála, Tȟašúŋke Witkó (Crazy Horse) from the Oglála and Miniconjou, and Siŋté Glešká (Spotted Tail) from the Brulé. More recent activists include Russell Means from the Oglála.

History

Siouan language speakers may have originated in the lower Mississippi River region and then migrated to or originated in the Ohio Valley. They were agriculturalists and may have been part of the Mound Builder civilization during the 9th–12th centuries CE. Lakota legend and other sources state they originally lived near the Great Lakes: "The tribes of the Dakota before European contact in the 1600s lived in the region around Lake Superior. In this forest environment, they lived by hunting, fishing, and gathering wild rice. They also grew some corn, but their locale was near the limit of where corn could be grown." This may be conflation with the Algonquian-speaking groups typically in that region, though Siouan peoples probably migrated there later. In the late 16th and early 17th centuries, Dakota-Lakota speakers lived in the upper Mississippi Region in what is now organized as the states of Minnesota, Wisconsin, Iowa, and the Dakotas. Conflicts with Anishnaabe and Cree peoples pushed the Lakota west onto the Great Plains in the mid- to late-17th century.

Early Lakota history is recorded in their winter counts (Lakota: waníyetu wówapi), pictorial calendars painted on hides, or later recorded on paper. The 'Battiste Good winter count' records Lakota history back to 900 CE when White Buffalo Calf Woman gave the Lakota people the White Buffalo Calf Pipe.

Around 1730 Cheyenne people introduced the Lakota to horses, which they called šuŋkawakaŋ ("dog [of] power/mystery/wonder"). After they adopted horse culture, Lakota society centered on the buffalo hunt on horseback. The total population of the Sioux (Lakota, Santee, Yankton, and Yanktonai) was estimated at 28,000 in 1660 by French explorers.  The Lakota population was estimated at 8,500 in 1805; it grew steadily and reached 16,110 in 1881, one of the few Native American tribes to increase in population in the 19th century. The number of Lakota has increased to more than 170,000 in 2010, of whom about 2,000 still speak the Lakota language (Lakȟótiyapi).

After 1720, the Lakota branch of the Seven Council Fires split into two major sects, the Saône, who moved to the Lake Traverse area on the South Dakota–North Dakota–Minnesota border, and the Oglála-Sičháŋǧu, who occupied the James River valley. However, by about 1750 the Saône had moved to the east bank of the Missouri River, followed 10 years later by the Oglála and Brulé (Sičháŋǧu).

The large and powerful Arikara, Mandan, and Hidatsa villages had long prevented the Lakota from crossing Missouri. However, the great smallpox epidemic of 1772–1780 destroyed three-quarters of these tribes. The Lakota crossed the river into the drier, short-grass prairies of the High Plains. These newcomers were the Saône, well-mounted and increasingly confident, who spread out quickly. In 1765, a Saône exploring and raiding party led by Chief Standing Bear discovered the Black Hills (the Paha Sapa), then the territory of the Cheyenne. Ten years later, the Oglála and Brulé also crossed the Missouri. Under pressure from the Lakota, the Cheyenne moved west to the Powder River country. The Lakota made the Black Hills their home.

Initial United States contact with the Lakota during the Lewis and Clark Expedition of 1804–1806 was marked by a standoff. Lakota bands refused to allow the explorers to continue upstream, and the expedition prepared for battle, which never came.

Some bands of Lakota became the first indigenous people to help the United States Army in an inter-tribal war west of the Missouri, during the Arikara War in 1823.

In 1843, the southern Lakota attacked Pawnee Chief Blue Coat's village near the Loup in Nebraska, killing many and burning half of the earth lodges. Next time the Lakota inflicted a blow so severe to the Pawnee would be in 1873, during the Massacre Canyon battle near Republican River.

Nearly half a century later, after the United States had built Fort Laramie without permission on Lakota land, it negotiated the Fort Laramie Treaty of 1851 to protect European-American travelers on the Oregon Trail. The Cheyenne and Lakota had previously attacked emigrant parties in a competition for resources, and also because some settlers had encroached on their lands. The Fort Laramie Treaty acknowledged Lakota sovereignty over the Great Plains in exchange for free passage for European Americans on the Oregon Trail for "as long as the river flows and the eagle flies".

The U.S. government did not enforce the treaty restriction against unauthorized settlement, and Lakota and other bands attacked settlers and even emigrant trains as part of their resistance to this encroachment, resulting in public pressure on the U.S. Army to punish them. On September 3, 1855, 700 soldiers under U.S. Brevet Major General William S. Harney avenged the Grattan massacre by attacking a Lakota village in Nebraska, killing about 100 men, women, and children. A series of short "wars" followed, and in 1862–1864, as Native American refugees from the "Dakota War of 1862" in Minnesota fled west to their allies in Montana and Dakota Territory. Increasing illegal settlement after the American Civil War resulted in war on the Plains again.

The Black Hills were considered sacred by the Lakota, and they objected to mining. Between 1866 and 1868 the U.S. Army fought the Lakota and their allies along the Bozeman Trail over U.S. forts built to protect miners traveling along the trail. Oglala Chief Red Cloud led his people to victory in Red Cloud's War. In 1868, the United States signed the Fort Laramie Treaty of 1868, exempting the Black Hills from all white settlement forever. Four years later gold was discovered there, and prospectors descended on the area.

The attacks on settlers and miners were met by military force conducted by army commanders such as Lieutenant Colonel George Armstrong Custer. General Philip Sheridan encouraged his troops to hunt and kill the buffalo as a means of "destroying the Indians' commissary."

The allied Lakota and Arapaho bands and the unified Northern Cheyenne were involved in much of the warfare after 1860. They fought a successful delaying action against General George Crook's army at the Battle of the Rosebud, preventing Crook from locating and attacking their camp. A week later they defeated the U.S. 7th Cavalry in 1876 at the Battle of the Greasy Grass at the Crow Indian Reservation (1868 boundaries). Custer attacked a camp of several tribes, much larger than he realized. Their combined forces, led by Chief Crazy Horse, killed 258 soldiers, wiping out the entire Custer battalion in the Battle of the Little Bighorn, and inflicting more than 50% casualties on the regiment.

The Lakota and their allies did not get to enjoy their victory over the U.S. Army for long. The U.S. Congress authorized funds to expand the army by 2,500 men. The reinforced US Army defeated the Lakota bands in a series of battles, finally ending the Great Sioux War in 1877. The Lakota were eventually confined to reservations, prevented from hunting buffalo beyond those territories, and forced to accept government food distribution.

In 1877, some of the Lakota bands signed a treaty that ceded the Black Hills to the United States; however, the nature of this treaty and its passage were controversial. The number of Lakota leaders who backed the treaty is highly disputed. Low-intensity conflicts continued in the Black Hills.  Fourteen years later, Sitting Bull was killed at Standing Rock reservation on December 15, 1890. The U.S. Army attacked Spotted Elk (aka Bigfoot)'s Mnicoujou band of Lakota on December 29, 1890, at Pine Ridge, killing 153 Lakota (tribal estimates are higher), including numerous women and children, in the Wounded Knee Massacre .

Today, the Lakota are found mostly in the five reservations of western South Dakota:

 Pine Ridge Indian Reservation, home of the Oglála, the most numerous of the Lakota bands.
 Rosebud Indian Reservation, home of the Upper Sičhánǧu or Brulé. 
 Lower Brule Indian Reservation, home of the Lower Sičhaŋǧu. 
 Cheyenne River Indian Reservation, home of several other of the seven Lakota bands, including the Mnikȟówožu, Itázipčho, Sihásapa, and Oóhenumpa. 
 Standing Rock Indian Reservation, home of the Húŋkpapȟa and to people from many other bands.

Lakota also live on the Fort Peck Indian Reservation in northeastern Montana, the Fort Berthold Indian Reservation of northwestern North Dakota, and several small reserves in Saskatchewan and Manitoba. During the Minnesota and Black Hills wars, their ancestors fled for refuge to "Grandmother's [i.e. Queen Victoria's] Land" (Canada).

Large numbers of Lakota live in Rapid City and other towns in the Black Hills, and in metro Denver. Lakota elders joined the Unrepresented Nations and Peoples Organization (UNPO) to seek protection and recognition for their cultural and land rights.

Government

United States

Legally and by treaty classified as a semi-autonomous "nation" within the United States, the federally recognized Lakota Sioux are represented locally by officials elected to councils for the several reservations and communities in the Dakotas, Minnesota, and Nebraska. These tribes have direct relationships with the federal government, primarily through the Bureau of Indian Affairs in the Department of Interior.

In addition, their residents can vote in local, state and federal elections. They are represented at the state and national level by officials elected from the political districts of their respective states and Congressional Districts.

Band or reservation members living both on and off the individual reservations are eligible to vote in periodic elections for that reservation. Each reservation has its own requirements for tribal membership or citizenship, as well as a unique local government style and election cycle based on its own constitution or articles of incorporation.  Most follow a multi-member tribal council model, with a chairman or president elected at-large, directly by the voters.
  The current President of the Oglala Sioux, the majority tribe of the Lakota located primarily on the Pine Ridge reservation, is Kevin Killer.
  The President of the Sičháŋǧu Lakota at the Rosebud reservation is Rodney M. Bordeaux.
  The Chairwoman of the Standing Rock reservation, which includes peoples from several Lakota subgroups including the Húŋkpapȟa, is Janet Alkire.
  The Chairman of the Cheyenne River Sioux Tribe at the Cheyenne River reservation, comprising the Mnikȟówožu, Itázipčho, Sihá Sápa, and Oóhenuŋpa bands of the Lakota, is Harold Frazier.
  The Chairman of the Lower Brule Sioux Tribe (also known as the Lower Sicangu Lakota), is Boyd I. Gourneau.

As semi-autonomous political entities, tribal governments have certain rights to independence from state laws. For instance, they may operate Indian gaming on their reservation if the state has passed related gaming laws. They are ultimately subject to supervisory oversight by the United States Congress and executive regulation through the Bureau of Indian Affairs. The nature and legitimacy of those relationships continue to be a matter of dispute.

Canada
Nine bands of Dakota and Lakota reside in Manitoba and southern Saskatchewan, with a total of 6,000 registered members. They are recognized as First Nations but are not considered "treaty Indians". As First Nations they receive rights and entitlements through the Indian and Northern Affairs Canada department. But because they are not recognized as treaty Indians, they did not participate in the land settlement and natural resource revenues. The Dakota rejected a $60-million land-rights settlement in 2008.

Independence movement

The Lakota are among tribal nations that have taken actions, participated in occupations, and proposed independence movements, particularly since the era of rising activism since the mid to late 20th century. They filed land claims against the federal government for what they defined as illegal taking of the Black Hills in the nineteenth century.

In 1980, the Supreme Court ruled in their favor and decided in United States v. Sioux Nation of Indians to award US$122 million to eight bands of Sioux Indians as compensation for their Black Hills land claims. The Sioux have refused the money, because accepting the settlement would legally terminate their demands for return of the Black Hills. The money remains in a Bureau of Indian Affairs account, accruing compound interest. As of 2011, the account has grown to over $1 billion.

In September 2007, the United Nations passed a non-binding Declaration on the Rights of Indigenous Peoples. Canada, the United States, Australia, and New Zealand refused to sign.

On December 20, 2007, a small group of people led by American Indian Movement activist Russell Means, under the name Lakota Freedom Delegation, traveled to Washington D.C. to announce a withdrawal of the Lakota Sioux from all treaties with the United States government. These activists had no standing under any elected tribal government.

Official Lakota tribal leaders issued public responses to the effect that, in the words of Rosebud Lakota tribal chairman Rodney Bordeaux, "We do not support what Means and his group are doing and they don't have any support from any tribal government I know of. They don't speak for us."

Means declared "The Republic of Lakotah", defining it as a sovereign nation with property rights over thousands of square miles in South Dakota, North Dakota, Nebraska, Wyoming and Montana. The group stated that they do not act for or represent the tribal governments "set up by the BIA or those Lakota who support the BIA system of government".

"The Lakota Freedom Delegation" did not include any elected leaders from any of the tribes. Means had previously run for president of the Oglala Sioux tribe and twice been defeated. Several tribal governments – elected by tribal members – issued statements distancing themselves from the independence declaration. Some said that they were watching the independent movement closely. No elected tribal governments endorsed the declaration.

Current activism 
The Lakota People made national news when NPR's "Lost Children, Shattered Families" investigative story aired regarding issues related to foster care for Native American children. It exposed what many critics consider to be the "kidnapping" of Lakota children from their homes by the state of South Dakota's Department of Social Services (D.S.S.). Lakota activists such as Madonna Thunder Hawk and Chase Iron Eyes, along with the Lakota People’s Law Project, have alleged that Lakota grandmothers are illegally denied the right to foster their own grandchildren. They are working to redirect federal funding away from the state of South Dakota's D.S.S. to new tribal foster care programs. This would be an historic shift away from the state's traditional control over Lakota foster children.

A short film, Lakota in America, was produced by Square. The film features Genevieve Iron Lightning, a young Lakota dancer on the Cheyenne River Reservation, one of the poorest communities in the United States. Unemployment, addiction, alcoholism, and suicide are all challenges for Lakota on the reservation.

Ethnonyms

The name Lakota comes from the Lakota autonym, Lakota "feeling affection, friendly, united, allied". The early French historic documents did not distinguish a separate Teton division, instead grouping them with other "Sioux of the West," Santee and Yankton bands.

The names Teton and Tetuwan come from the Lakota name thítȟuŋwaŋ, the meaning of which is obscure. This term was used to refer to the Lakota by non-Lakota Sioux groups. Other derivations and spelling variations include: ti tanka, Tintonyanyan, Titon, Tintonha, Thintohas, Tinthenha, Tinton, Thuntotas, Tintones, Tintoner, Tintinhos, Ten-ton-ha, Thinthonha, Tinthonha, Tentouha, Tintonwans, Tindaw, Tinthow, Atintons, Anthontans, Atentons, Atintans, Atrutons, Titoba, Tetongues, Teton Sioux, Teeton, Ti toan, Teetwawn, Teetwans, Ti-t’-wawn, Ti-twans, Tit’wan, Tetans, Tieton, and Teetonwan.

Early French sources call the Lakota Sioux with an additional modifier, such as Sioux of the West, West Schious, Sioux des prairies, Sioux occidentaux, Sioux of the Meadows, Nadooessis of the Plains, Prairie Indians, Sioux of the Plain, Maskoutens-Nadouessians, Mascouteins Nadouessi, and Sioux nomades.

Today many of the tribes continue to officially call themselves Sioux. In the 19th and 20th centuries, this was the name which the US government applied to all Dakota/Lakota people. However, some tribes have formally or informally adopted traditional names: the Rosebud Sioux Tribe is also known as the Sičháŋǧu Oyáte (Brulé Nation), and the Oglala often use the name Oglála Lakȟóta Oyáte, rather than the English "Oglala Sioux Tribe" or OST. (The alternate English spelling of Ogallala is deprecated, even though it is closer to the correct pronunciation.) The Lakota have names for their own subdivisions. The Lakota also are the most western of the three Sioux groups, occupying lands in both North and South Dakota.

Reservations

Today, one half of all enrolled Sioux live off reservations.

Lakota reservations recognized by the U.S. government include:
 Oglala (Pine Ridge Indian Reservation, South Dakota and Nebraska)
 Sicangu (Rosebud Indian Reservation, South Dakota) & (Lower Brule Indian Reservation, South Dakota)
 Hunkpapa (Standing Rock Reservation, North Dakota and South Dakota)
 Miniconjou (Cheyenne River Sioux Reservation, South Dakota)
 Itazipco (Cheyenne River Sioux Reservation, South Dakota)
 Siha Sapa (Cheyenne River Sioux Reservation, South Dakota)
 Ooinunpa (Cheyenne River Sioux Reservation, South Dakota)
Some Lakota also live on other Sioux reservations in eastern South Dakota, Minnesota, and Nebraska:
 Santee Indian Reservation, in Nebraska
 Crow Creek Indian Reservation in Central South Dakota
 Yankton Indian Reservation in Central South Dakota
 Flandreau Indian Reservation in Eastern South Dakota
 Lake Traverse Indian Reservation in Northeastern South Dakota and Southeastern North Dakota
 Lower Sioux Indian Reservation in Minnesota
 Upper Sioux Indian Reservation in Minnesota
 Shakopee-Mdewakanton Indian Reservation in Minnesota
 Prairie Island Indian Reservation in Minnesota

In addition, several Lakota live on the Wood Mountain First Nation reserve, near Wood Mountain Regional Park in Saskatchewan, Canada.

See also
 Lakota mythology
 List of Lakota people
 Native American tribes in Nebraska

Notes

References

 Beck, Paul N. (2013). Columns of Vengeance: Soldiers, Sioux, and the Punitive Expeditions, 1863–1864. Norman, OK: University of Oklahoma Press.
 Christafferson, Dennis M. (2001). "Sioux, 1930–2000". In R. J. DeMallie (Ed.), Handbook of North American Indians: Plains (Vol. 13, Part 2, pp. 821–839). W. C. Sturtevant (Gen. Ed.). Washington, D.C.: Smithsonian Institution. .
 DeMallie, Raymond J. (2001a). "Sioux until 1850". In R. J. DeMallie (Ed.), Handbook of North American Indians: Plains (Vol. 13, Part 2, pp. 718–760). W. C. Sturtevant (Gen. Ed.). Washington, D.C.: Smithsonian Institution. .
 DeMallie, Raymond J. (2001b). "Teton". In R. J. DeMallie (Ed.), Handbook of North American Indians: Plains (Vol. 13, Part 2, pp. 794–820). W. C. Sturtevant (Gen. Ed.). Washington, D.C.: Smithsonian Institution. .
 Hämäläinen, Pekka. (2019). Lakota America: A New History of Indigenous Power, New Haven, CT: Yale University Press. .
 Matson, William and Frethem, Mark (2006).  Producers.  "The Authorized Biography of Crazy Horse and His Family Part One: Creation, Spirituality, and the Family Tree". The Crazy Horse family tells their oral history and with explanations of Lakota spirituality and culture on DVD. (Publisher is Reelcontact.com)
 Parks, Douglas R.; & Rankin, Robert L. (2001). "The Siouan Languages". In R. J. DeMallie (Ed.), Handbook of North American Indians: Plains (Vol. 13, Part 1, pp. 94–114). W. C. Sturtevant (Gen. Ed.). Washington, D.C.: Smithsonian Institution. .
 Pritzker, Barry M. A Native American Encyclopedia: History, Culture, and Peoples. Oxford: Oxford University Press, 2000. .

External links

 The Official Lakota Language Forum
 Lakota Language Consortium
 Cheyenne River Sioux Tribe Official Website 

 
Sioux
Plains tribes
Native American history of North Dakota
Native American history of South Dakota
Siouan peoples
Native American tribes in North Dakota
Native American tribes in South Dakota
 
Members of the Unrepresented Nations and Peoples Organization
Native American tribes in Montana
Articles containing video clips